{{DISPLAYTITLE:C18H22N4O2}}
The molecular formula C18H22N4O2 (molar mass: 326.17 g/mol, exact mass: 326.1743 u) may refer to:

 EGIS-7625
 Peficitinib (Smyraf)